Sagina is a 1974 Hindi film, produced by J. K. Kapur and directed by Tapan Sinha, the film stars Dilip Kumar, Saira Banu, Aparna Sen, Om Prakash. It was a remake of 1970 Bengali movie Sagina Mahato directed by Tapan Sinha with the same lead pair in the cast. This version was a commercial failure, and Dilip Kumar's first consecutive failure in almost three decades since 1945. His last film Dastaan (1972) was also a commercial failure.

Plot
Sagina is a factory laborer, and an aggressive, honest and lovable character who was the first to fight against the tyranny of the British bosses in the tea gardens of North-Eastern India.

Cast
 Dilip Kumar as Sagina Mahato
 Saira Banu as Lalita
 Aparna Sen as Vishakha 
 Om Prakash as Guru
 Kader Khan as Anupam Dutt
 K. N. Singh as Factory Owner

Music
The film has music by S. D. Burman and lyrics by Majrooh Sultanpuri. This movie marked the first and only time Kishore Kumar sang for Dilip Kumar.
 "Saala Mein To Sahab Ban Gaya, Sahab Ban Ke Kaisa Tan Gaya" - Kishore Kumar
 "Uparwala Dukhiyon Ki Nahi Sunta Tha" - Kishore Kumar
 "Gajab Chamki Bindiya Tori Aadhi Raat" - Kishore Kumar and Asha Bhosle 
 "Tumre Sang To Rain Bitayee" - Kishore Kumar and Lata Mangeshkar 
 "Chote Chote Sapne Hamaar, Choti Asha Chota Pyar" - S. D. Burman

"Chote Chote Sapne Hamar" was reused from the Bengali film, Sagina Mahato, with music by Anup Ghoshal.

Awards and legacy
The film won the 1974 Filmfare Best Art Direction Award for Sudhendu Roy. In the 1975 film Chupke Chupke a billboard featuring the poster can briefly be seen.

References

External links 
 

Films scored by S. D. Burman
1974 films
1970s Hindi-language films
Hindi remakes of Bengali films
Films set in the British Raj
Films about the labor movement
Films set in the 1940s
Indian films based on actual events
Films directed by Tapan Sinha